Dystrophy is the degeneration of tissue, due to disease or malnutrition, most likely due to heredity.

Types
 Muscular dystrophy
 Duchenne muscular dystrophy
 Becker's muscular dystrophy
 Myotonic dystrophy
 Reflex neurovascular dystrophy
 Retinal dystrophy
 Cone dystrophy
 Corneal dystrophy
 Lipodystrophy
 Nail dystrophy

See also 
 Muscle weakness
 Muscle atrophy
 Myotonia
 List of biological development disorders

Medical terminology